Semak (Ukrainian, Russian: Сема́к) is a Ukrainian surname that may refer to:

 Alexander Semak (born 1966), Soviet and Russian ice hockey player
 Andrei Semak (born 1974), Russian footballer
 Sergei Semak (born 1976), Russian footballer

Other 
 The Sefer Mitzvot Katan, by Isaac ben Joseph of Corbeil

Russian-language surnames